Coruche is a municipality in Santarém District in Portugal. The population in 2011 was 19,944, in an area of 1115.72 km².

The present Mayor is Francisco Silvestre de Oliveira, elected by the Socialist Party.

The Coruche City Council has also six City Councillors: Joaquim Filipe Coelho Serrão, Francisco Silvestre de Oliveira and Nelson Fernando Nunes Galvão elected by the Socialist Party, and Ricardo Jorge Rato Ferreira Raposo, Isidro Rodrigo Silva Catarino and António Joaquim Soares elected by Coligação Democrática Unitária. The municipal holiday is August 17.

Parishes

Administratively, the municipality is divided into 6 civil parishes (freguesias):
 Biscainho - which includes the settlement of Courelas
 Branca -  which includes Arriça, Figueiras
 Coruche, Fajarda e Erra - which includes Azervadinha, Erra, Fajarda, Foros do Paul, Frazão, Vale Mansos, Santo Antonino
 Couço - which includes Couço, Santa Justa, Foros de Lagoiços, Volta do Vale, Courelinhas, Varejola
 Santana do Mato - which includes Carapuções
 São José da Lamarosa - which includes Azerveira, Zebrinho, Feixe

Climate

Municipal holiday

The festival happens from August 14 to the 18 except a few years (including 2005) when it ended 19. This party is in honor of Nossa Senhora do Castelo (lit. Our Lady of the Castle).
On August 14 at midnight a fireworks show starts the festival. On 17 August, the holiday, a bullfight is made in honor of Our Lady. Many runnings of bulls (a minor version of Pamplona's encierro) happen during the festivity.
During all days late night parties happen in traditional local pubs.

Notable people 
 Maria Rosa Viseu (1935 in Couço – 2014) political activist and political prisoner; opposed the Estado Novo regime
 José Peseiro (born 1960 in Coruche) a Portuguese football manager and former player

See also
Viver Coruche
Coruche Biennial
Coruche IPR

References

External links

 Photos from Coruche

 
Towns in Portugal
Populated places in Santarém District
Municipalities of Santarém District